"Rat Trap" is a single by The Boomtown Rats which reached No. 1 in the UK Singles Chart for two weeks in November 1978, the first single by a punk or new wave act to do so. 
It was written by Bob Geldof, and produced by Robert John "Mutt" Lange. It replaced "Summer Nights", a hit single for John Travolta and Olivia Newton-John from the soundtrack of Grease, at number one in the UK chart after the latter's seven-week reign.

Song
It is a rock song, telling the tale of a boy called Billy who feels the depressing town he lives in is a "rat trap".

When the band performed the song on  Top of the Pops (which is also mentioned in the song) as the UK new number one, the band members began by tearing up pictures of Travolta and Newton-John to emphasise the fact that the pair - who had spent a total of 16 weeks out of the preceding 22 at the top of the charts - had been deposed. Geldof mimed the saxophone part on a candelabra, a jest he explained in his autobiography Is That It?: "The Musicians' Union had forbidden me to play saxophone on the video, as obviously I hadn't done so on the record. But I saw a candelabra on the piano at the shoot and I put a mouthpiece in the central candle holder and played it. The impact of video came home when during the next few British gigs kids pulled out candelabras from nowhere and began playing them during the sax solo in 'Rat Trap'".

In the music video, which was directed by David Mallet, various members of the band are seen reading copies of the novel Rat Trap by the Welsh author Craig Thomas, although the book has no connection to the song. The lyric about "pus and grime..." was changed to "blood and tears pour down the drains and the sewers", although Geldof mumbled the line anyway.

One of the more popular Boomtown Rats songs, it was performed by them at Live Aid and is still performed by Geldof to this day.  During the Live Aid performance, Geldof's microphone went dead (apparently from the cable being damaged), causing Simon Crowe's harmony vocals to become the only audible voice on the last half of the song.  This performance was not included on the DVD.
In 1996 Geldof recorded a self-mocking cover version of the song with Dustin The Turkey which reached number one in Ireland.

Personnel
 Bob Geldof – vocals
 Pete Briquette – bass, vocals
 Gerry Cott – guitar
 Johnnie Fingers – keyboards, vocals
 Simon Crowe – drums, vocals
 Garry Roberts – guitar, vocals
 Alan Holmes – saxophone

References

1978 singles
UK Singles Chart number-one singles
Irish Singles Chart number-one singles
The Boomtown Rats songs
Song recordings produced by Robert John "Mutt" Lange
1978 songs
Ensign Records singles
Columbia Records singles
Music videos directed by David Mallet (director)